10 Magazine is a British luxury quarterly magazine published in London, UK.

History and profile
10 Magazine was founded in 2001 by Sophia Neophitou-Apostolou, who served as editor-in-chief. The magazine is published by ZAC Publishing on a quarterly basis. It covers fashion, contemporary art and beauty. However, it is considered a niche fashion magazine in comparison to similar magazines like Vogue and Vanity Fair.

Covers of 10 Magazine have featured Victoria Beckham, Debbie Harry and Noomi Rapace and covers of 10 Men have featured David Beckham, David Gandy and James Franco.

Spin off
In 2003, 10 Magazine launched a second publication called 10 Men. The bi-annual magazine, which is also edited by Neophitou-Apostolou, focuses on male fashion, contemporary art, and male grooming and is printed in C4 format. In August 2015, 10 Men was revamped with a new design.

References

External links
Official website

Fashion magazines published in the United Kingdom
Lifestyle magazines published in the United Kingdom
Quarterly magazines published in the United Kingdom
Independent magazines
Magazines published in London
Magazines established in 2001
Men's fashion magazines
Women's fashion magazines